Andropogon benthamianus is a species of grass in the family Poaceae.
It is found only in Ecuador, where it is known from only a single collection. It has been listed as critically endangered, and is feared extinct today.

References

benthamianus
Endemic flora of Ecuador
Taxonomy articles created by Polbot